A small fraction of the world's population ever competes at the Olympic Games; an even smaller fraction ever competes in multiple Games. 869 athletes (603 men and 266 women) have participated in at least five Olympics from Athens 1896 to Beijing 2022, but excluding the 1906 Intercalated Games. 214 of these have gone on to make at least a sixth Olympic appearance.

Multiple appearances
Several athletes would have made more appearances at the Olympics but for reasons out of their control, such as World Wars (no Olympics were held in 1916, 1940 or 1944), politically motivated boycotts, financial difficulties, or ill-timed injuries.

Canadian equestrian athlete Ian Millar has competed at ten Olympic games. Austrian sailor Hubert Raudaschl, Latvian shooter Afanasijs Kuzmins (representing Soviet Union until 1988) and Georgian sports shooter Nino Salukvadze (representing Soviet Union in 1988 and Unified Team in 1992) have each made nine Olympic appearances.

Well over half of six-time Olympians belong to the shooting, equestrian, sailing and fencing disciplines, which are known for allowing athletes more longevity at the elite level. Athletics and cross-country skiing also provide a large number of athletes who have competed at five Olympics.

Approximately a quarter of long-competing athletes are female. Italian canoeist Josefa Idem became the first woman to take part in eight Olympics, eventually reaching the final of the K1-500m event at the age of 48. Before her, the closest a female athlete had come to competing at eight Olympics was 0.028 seconds, which was the time by which Jamaican-Slovenian sprinter Merlene Ottey had failed to meet the qualification time required for appearance at the 2008 Summer Olympics, at age 48. At the 2020 Summer Olympics, Georgian sports shooter Nino Salukvadze competed in her ninth consecutive Olympic Games at age 52, becoming the first female athlete in history to do so.

Four six-time Olympians here have participated in Olympic Games over a period of 40 years: Bahamian sailor Durward Knowles (8 Olympics), Danish sailor Paul Elvstrøm (8), Danish fencer Ivan Osiier (7), and Norwegian sailor Magnus Konow (6). Note should also be made of Japanese equestrian Hiroshi Hoketsu, whose first and third Olympic appearances in 1964 and 2012 were 48 years apart. Uzbek gymnast Oksana Chusovitina has competed at every Olympics from 1992-2020. She continues to compete at the elite level in her late 40s in a sport where few competitors continue past their mid-20s or compete at two or three Olympics.

Two five-time Olympians competed under four different flags at the Olympics, one of whom never actually changed nationality. Both shooter Jasna Šekarić (6 Olympics) and table tennis player Ilija Lupulesku (5) competed for Yugoslavia at the 1988 Olympics. In 1992, since Yugoslavia was under UN sanctions, they (and fifty other Serbians, Montenegrins and Macedonians) competed as Independent Olympic Participants before competing at the next Olympics under the flag of Serbia and Montenegro. Lupulesku became an American citizen and competed for the USA in 2004, while Šekarić finally competed for Serbia in 2008.

Twenty-six five-time Olympians have won at least eight medals: American swimmer Michael Phelps (28), Norwegian cross-country skier Marit Bjørgen (15), Norwegian biathlete Ole Einar Bjørndalen (13), Italian fencer Edoardo Mangiarotti (13), Dutch speed skater Ireen Wüst (13), German kayaker Birgit Fischer (12), American swimmer Dara Torres (12), a German equestrian Isabell Werth (12), American track and field athlete Allyson Felix (11), Italian short track speed skater Arianna Fontana (11), Hungarian fencer Aladár Gerevich (10), Italian cross-country skier Stefania Belmondo (10), Finnish gymnast Heikki Savolainen (9), Jamaican-Slovenian sprinter Merlene Ottey (9), German speed skater Claudia Pechstein (9), Italian fencer Valentina Vezzali (9), Dutch equestrian Anky van Grunsven (9), German biathlete Uschi Disl (9), Romanian rower Elisabeta Oleniuc (8), German equestrian Reiner Klimke (8), Italian fencer Giovanna Trillini (8), French fencer Philippe Cattiau (8), Jamaican track and field athlete Veronica Campbell-Brown (8), Russian diver Dmitri Sautin (8), Norwegian alpine skier Kjetil André Aamodt (8) and German biathlete Ricco Groß (8).

About thirty athletes who have competed in at least five Olympics participated in two sports, with nearly half of them competing at both the Winter and Summer Olympics. The most common cross-over sports are biathlon/cross-country skiing (six athletes competed in both), athletics/bobsleigh (five competitors), and cycling/speed skating (five competitors).

Married couples among five-time Olympians include biathletes Ole Einar Bjørndalen (Norway) and Nathalie Santer-Bjørndalen (Italy/Belgium), Lithuanian pairs figure skaters Margarita Drobiazko and Povilas Vanagas, Finnish cross-country skiers Harri Kirvesniemi and Marja-Liisa Kirvesniemi-Hämäläinen, lugers Susi Erdmann (Germany) and Gerhard Plankensteiner (Italy).

Familial relationships among five-time Olympians include Belgian shooters François Lafortune Sr and Jr (father-son; with their brothers/uncles, they have seventeen Olympic appearances between them), Italian equestrians Piero and Raimondo d'Inzeo (brothers),  British canoeists Andrew and Stephen Train (brothers), Greek shooters Alexandros and Ioannis Theofilakis (brothers), Italian cross-country skiers Sabina and Fulvio Valbusa (sister-brother), Brazilian equestrians Nelson and Rodrigo Pessoa (father-son), Austrian lugers Markus and Tobias Schiegl (cousins). A more tenuous relationship is that of Argentine sailors Jorge Salas Chávez and Roberto Sieburger; Chávez's cousin Jorge del Río Salas (4 Olympics) married Sieburger's cousin Marylin Sieburger. (The extended Sieburger-Salas clan includes seven Argentinian sailors with twenty Olympic appearances.)

List of athletes with at least six Olympic appearances

So far, there have been 214 athletes who have appeared at Olympic Games at least six times. 63 of them have never won an Olympic medal. Athletes in bold are believed to be still active, i.e., have yet to announce their retirement. Female athletes are displayed with a pink background. Sorting is by number of appearances, Games of last appearance, date of birth.

Athletes with at least five Olympic appearances

869 athletes have competed in at least five Olympic Games (873 if the 1906 Games are counted) between 1896 and 2022 inclusive. They are listed here, grouped by discipline. The columns labelled 'N+' denote the number of athletes who have competed in at least N Olympics. The number of male and female athletes who have competed in at least five Olympics are also listed, in the columns labelled 'M' and 'F'.

Athletes who have competed in more than one sport are counted once per sport.

Intercalated Games

The 1906 Intercalated Games are not considered 'official' Olympics, but medals were awarded.

The following athletes have appeared in at least 7 Olympics if 1906 Intercalated Games are included.

The following athletes have appeared in at least 6 Olympics if 1906 Intercalated Games are included.

The following athletes have appeared in at least 5 Olympics if 1906 Intercalated Games are included.

Dual sport and multi-sport Olympians

Are so many the Olympians have competed in two or more sports. These athletes are listed below, with the number of times they competed in each sport. Sometimes they competed in two disciplines at the same Games; such instances are noted.

The most common combinations of disciplines are biathlon/cross-country skiing (six athletes competed in both; each sport is a winter sport), athletics/bobsleigh (seven competitors; summer and winter sports respectively), and cycling/speed skating (five athletes; summer and winter sports respectively).

N.b.: Chris Mackintosh has participated at the 1924 Summer Olympics in marathon but in the Olympic website he has a participation in the 1924 Winter Olympics but he didn't start any race in the Winter Olympics, so I don't know if insert him in this list or not.

Summer and Winter Olympians

Summer Olympians
Below is a list of athletes who participated in two or more sports. Viggo Jensen from Denmark, Carl Schuhmann from Germany and Britain's Launceston Elliot are the only athletes to compete in four different sports. Sheila Taormina from USA is the only woman to have competed in three different sports.

Of the athletes who participated in two or more Summer Olympics in two different sports, 29 are Swedish and 26 of them participated in the home Olympics in Stockholm 1912.

Frank Kugler and Leo Goodwin are the only athletes to win medals in three different sports. They are both from USA and won medals in all three sports at home in St. Louis in 1904. Only two female athletes, the British Rebecca Romero and the East German Roswitha Krause have won medals in two different sports.

The only athletes to win gold medals in two different sports at two different Olympic Games are Paul Radmilovic from Great Britain and Daniel Norling from Sweden.

Only one athlete competed in two different sports and for two different countries, the Italian-Polish Katarzyna Juszczak.

Winter Olympians

 

N.B.: Esko Järvinen, Ole Stenen, Ole Reistad, Otto Furrer, Bronisław Czech and Reidar Ødegaard have participated at the military patrol at the 1928 Winter Olympics in military patrol but it was just a demonstrative sport, so it's not clear if their Olympic appearance in military patrol in this Olympics is official or not.

See also
List of multiple Olympic medalists
List of multiple Olympic gold medalists
List of multiple Olympic medalists at a single Games
List of multiple Olympic gold medalists at a single Games
List of multiple Olympic medalists in one event
List of multiple Olympic gold medalists in one event
List of athletes who competed in both the Summer and Winter Olympic games

References

 Personal communication from Dr. Bill Mallon, past-President and co-founder, International Society of Olympic Historians

External links
Olympics at Sports-Reference – Olympic athletes biographies and profiles
 Records of the Olympic Games 
 Olympians with long careers (upload to Sydney 2000)
Olympedia

Olympic records
Lists of Olympic competitors